The 1996 UK & Ireland Greyhound Racing Year was the 70th year of greyhound racing in the United Kingdom and Ireland.

Roll of honour

Summary
The National Greyhound Racing Club (NGRC) released the annual returns, with totalisator turnover at £73,575,880 from 6384 meetings. The drop in tote turnover could be partly attributed to the first full year of the National Lottery which had begun the previous November.

Spring Rose trained by Charlie Lister was voted Greyhound of the Year after winning the Grand Prix at Walthamstow Stadium and the St Leger at Wembley. She broke the Walthamstow track record twice on her way to winning the Grand Prix and made the St Leger final unbeaten before clocking 39.29 in the final, a new track record.

Linda Mullins became the first woman to win the Greyhound Trainer of the Year.

Tracks
There was no news on the London Stadium (Hackney) which was in administration, the situation looked unsettled despite good reviews about the stadium. It also hosted the Trainers Championship won by Ernie Gaskin Sr.

Ramsgate Stadium was closed by the receivers but sister track Oxford Stadium was bought by Isle of Man businessman Don Joyce who brought in a new General Manager Dan McCormack.

Sittingbourne closed following financial problems but was re-opened by Roger Cearns, the grandson of WJ Cearns the founder of Wimbledon Stadium.

The National Lottery was cited as one of the main reasons why Raikes Park Greyhound Stadium in Bolton closed. The site on by the Raikes colliery on the Manchester Road had been one of the most prestigious Independent tracks and hosted the Independent Derby, St Leger and Guineas. It was a major loss within the independent circles and the independents had a bad year because Bury St Edmunds also closed.

News
Former Slough and Wembley trainer Ted Dickson died leaving daughter Hazel to run the kennels on her own. When Ramsgate closed trainer Peter Rich moved to Catford and then Romford in quick succession. Hove trainer Bill Masters retired leaving Alan (Claude) Gardiner to take over the kennel. Gardiner was previously assistant to Brian Clemenson. Romford installed former Bolton Racing Manager Peter O'Dowd as the new Racing Manager to replace Steve Daniel who had only recently replaced Ray Spalding.

The Bord na gCon sold the site of the Cork Greyhound Stadium in Cork and purchased a green-field site in Curraheen on the western fringes of the city with the intention of building a brand new facility there.

The Intertrack betting service was introduced for the first time enabling racegoers at other tracks around the country to view the racing and place bets direct into the Wimbledon tote.

Competitions
A greyhound called Some Picture looked a great prospect after winning the Select Stakes and Eclipse.

Principal UK races

	

+Track Record

+Track Record

Totalisator returns

The totalisator returns declared to the National Greyhound Racing Club for the year 1996 are listed below.

References 

Greyhound racing in the United Kingdom
Greyhound racing in the Republic of Ireland
UK and Ireland Greyhound Racing Year
UK and Ireland Greyhound Racing Year
UK and Ireland Greyhound Racing Year
UK and Ireland Greyhound Racing Year